Ger Coughlan (born 31 October 1957) is an Irish retired hurler who played as a left wing-forward for the Offaly senior team.

Born in Kinnitty, County Offaly, Coughlan first arrived on the inter-county scene at the age of twenty-two when he made his senior debut with Offaly in the 1979-80 National Hurling League. Coughlan went on to play a key part for Offaly during a hugely successful era for the team, and won two All-Ireland medals and seven Leinster medals. He was an All-Ireland runner-up on one occasion.

At club level Coughlan won five championship medals with Kinnitty.

Throughout his career Coughlan made 34 championship appearances. His retirement came following the conclusion of the 1990 championship.

In retirement from playing, Coughlan became involved in team management and coaching, taking charge of the OFfaly minor and under-21 teams on various occasions. He has also served as a selector with the Offaly senior team.

References

1957 births
Living people
Kinnitty hurlers
Offaly inter-county hurlers
All-Ireland Senior Hurling Championship winners